The discography of Stars, a Canadian indie pop band, consists of nine studio albums, two remix albums, six extended plays, one video album and eighteen singles.

Albums

Studio albums

Other albums

Video albums

Extended plays

Singles

Compilations

Notes

References

Discographies of Canadian artists
Rock music group discographies